The 1907 Utah Agricultural Aggies football team was an American football team that represented Utah Agricultural College (later renamed Utah State University) as an independent during the 1907 college football season. In their first season under head coach Fred M. Walker, the Aggies compiled a 5–1 record and outscored opponents by a total of 156 to 25.

On November 25, 1907, the Aggies played the "Crimsons", a team formed by Brigham Young College students and led by coach Art Badenoch. The Aggies won the game, 100–0. The 100-point victory over the Crimsons remains the second largest margin in Utah State football history.

Walker later became a pitcher in Major League Baseball.

Schedule

References

Utah Agricultural
Utah State Aggies football seasons
Utah Agricultural Aggies football